Justo Fernández (born 20 June 1941) is a Mexican sports shooter. He competed in the mixed trap event at the 1976 Summer Olympics.

References

1941 births
Living people
Mexican male sport shooters
Olympic shooters of Mexico
Shooters at the 1976 Summer Olympics
Place of birth missing (living people)
Pan American Games medalists in shooting
Pan American Games bronze medalists for Mexico
Shooters at the 1975 Pan American Games
20th-century Mexican people